Mfantsiman Municipal Assembly is one of the twenty-two districts in Central Region, Ghana. Originally created as an ordinary district assembly in 1988 when it was known as Mfantsiman District, which was created from the former Mfantsiman District Council; until it was later elevated to municipal district assembly status on 29 February 2008 to become Mfantsiman Municipal District. However, on 28 June 2012, the eastern part of the district was split off to create Ekumfi District; thus, the remaining part has been retained as the Mfantsiman Municipal Assembly. The municipality is located in the southwest part of Central Region and has Saltpond as its capital town.

Geography
The Mfantsiman municipality is located along the Atlantic coastline of the Central Region of Ghana and extends from latitudes 5° to 5°20’ north of the equator and longitudes 0°44’ to 1°11’ west of the Greenwich Meridian, stretching for about 21 kilometers along the coastline and for about 13 kilometers inland and constituting an area of 612 square kilometers. The municipal capital is Saltpond.

The municipality is bounded to the west and northwest by Abura-Asebu-Kwamankese District, to the east by Ekumfi District and to the south by the Atlantic Ocean. The District as of 2012 stretched from Mankessim to Yamoransa.

Economy
The inhabitants are mainly employed through fishing, farming or trading. The capital Saltpond was the birthplace of Convention People's Party (CPP), The founders use to stay in a house named Caanan Lodge, the party of Osagyefo Dr Kwame Nkrumah. Kwame Nkrumah planted a palm tree that signified the birth of UGCC in the town. The palm tree is found in the centre of Saltpond. The first tarred road in Ghana is also found in Saltpond.

The municipality houses the Akanland Ceramics factory (formerly) but now a paper producing company and also known to be the first place to begin off-shore oil-drilling in Ghana.

List of settlements

Past members of parliament
 Mr. Abakah-Quansah: 1992–1996
 Mr. Jacob Arthur: 1996–2000, 2000–2004
 Mr. Stephen Asamoah Boateng: 2004–2008
 Mr. Aquainas Tawiah Quansah: 2008–2012, 2012–2016
 Mr. Ekow Kwansah Hayford: 2016-2020
 Ophelia Mensah: 2017 - present

Notable people
Some important people who hail from Mfantsiman Municipality are:

 Prof. Francis K. A. Allotey
 Prof. Paul Archibald Vianey Ansah
 Prof. William Otoo Ellis- Vice Chancellor, Kwame Nkrumah University of Science and Technology (KNUST), Ghana 
 Prof. Kwesi Andam – Former Vice Chancellor, KNUST, Ghana (He was an indigene until Ekumfi District was carved out of Mfantsiman Municipality)
 King Peggy
 Dr. James Kwegyir Aggrey
 John Mensah Sarbah 
 Kobina Arku Korsah (Sir Arku Korsah)
 Ama Ata Aidoo
 William Ansah Sessarakoo
 George Ekem Ferguson
 K. B. Anann
 Isaac Dadzie Honny
 Lawyer Kweku Yamoah Painstil
 Mr. Isaac Kwegyir Essel(Proprietor- Sabs Smerbu Memorial JHS)
 CSOP Prince Essel- Nana Osreko Yamoah Ponko I (Akwamuhene of Mankessim Traditional Area)
 Mrs Agnes Ama Bentsiwaa Botchway
 Daasebre Kwebu Ewusi VII (Omanhene of Abeadze Traditional Area)
 Mr. Hariom Ewusie Anan (Proprietor – Hariom International School)

Sources
 
 District: Mfantsiman Municipal District

References

Central Region (Ghana)
Districts of the Central Region (Ghana)